Critical Masses: Opposition to Nuclear Power in California, 1958–1978 is the first detailed history of the  anti-nuclear movement in the United States, written by Thomas Wellock. It is also the first state-level research on the subject with a focus on California. Reviewer Paula Garb has said:

The book is rich with vivid verbal pictures and the passionate voices of participants on all sides of the controversy around the peaceful atom. It is based on interviews, documents from state and federal archives, and activist papers. Wellock brings to this project the expertise of a former engineer for civilian and navy nuclear reactors, a thorough archivist, and a sensitive interviewer.

The central argument of the book is that the anti-nuclear movement played a key part in the Californian nuclear power demise up to 1978.

See also

Anti-nuclear movement in California
Anti-nuclear protests in the United States
List of books about nuclear issues
List of articles associated with nuclear issues in California
Nuclear power in the United States
Nuclear whistleblowers

References

External links
Critical Masses: Opposition to Nuclear Power in California, 1958–1978 
Nuclear Politics in America: A History and Theory of Government Regulation / Critical Masses: Opposition to Nuclear Power in California, 1958–1978 / Licensed to Kill? The Nuclear Regulatory Commission and the Shoreham Power Plant

1998 non-fiction books
Anti–nuclear power movement
Books about nuclear issues
History books about the United States
Books about California
Environment of California
Energy in California